Karate at the 2011 Pacific Games in Nouméa, New Caledonia was held on August 31–September 2, 2011.

Medal summary

Medal table

Men

Women

References

Karate at the 2011 Pacific Games

2011 in karate
2011 Pacific Games
Karate at the Pacific Games